Oedicarena is a genus of tephritid  or fruit flies in the family Tephritidae.

Species
The genus contains the following species.

 Oedicarena beameri
 Oedicarena diffusa
 Oedicarena latifrons
 Oedicarena nigra
 Oedicarena persuasa
 Oedicarena tetanops

References

Trypetinae
Tephritidae genera